Palace Cinemas is the fifth largest major cinema chain in Australia, with various locations in CBD and inner suburban areas of most capital cities. Palace Cinemas currently comprises 24 cinemas with 180 screens and more than 550 staff. Its head office is based in the Melbourne suburb of South Yarra, close to its Cinema Como flagship.
In 2015, the chain saved The Astor Theatre, which remains the southern hemisphere's oldest continuously running single screen theatre.

Palace Cinemas
The Palace Cinema chain operates in most states, except Tasmania and the Northern Territory. They exhibit films of either a mainstream, classic or an arthouse type, but the cinemas are usually focused on one film type or the other. The mainstream cinemas usually have several auditoriums that are fitted for projecting RealD 3D films, but unlike other major chains this is only on one or two dedicated screens. Initially Palace used Dolby 3D for several years before converting to the cheaper 3D format. Due to a recent decline in demand for the format, Palace now rarely shows films in 3D as of mid-2016.

Palace operates several cinemas that originally opened as single-screen theatres, some of which have received heritage status. All, except for the heritage-protected Astor, have subsequently been renovated and internally converted to multiplex, sometimes with the original screen, remaining as the largest auditorium/cinema at each venue. The original facades, box office, candy-bar and foyers in these historic venues have been modernised and restored with care.

In the Melbourne suburb of Brighton, Palace operates two cinemas within 10 minutes' drive of each other, making it one of the only operators in Australia to own two indoor cinemas in the same suburb. Dendy Brighton, on Church Street, is more centralised in Brighton's main shopping strip, and therefore shows commercial films. Brighton Bay, is in another smaller shopping strip on Bay Street, in North Brighton, and plays mostly arthouse films.

In late 2016, Palace shifted their head office to a new location and used the office space from old building to significantly expand, restore and renovate the original Balwyn location into an 11-screen multiplex with three fully licensed bars. The renovation preserved the heritage-listed aspects of the building, and was the cinema's second restoration in under ten years.

The Pentridge Cinema opened in 2020 in the shopping centre located inside the old HM Prison Pentridge in the northern Melbourne suburb of Coburg. It was the first Palace Cinema to open with a Dolby Atmos dedicated auditorium.

In New South Wales, Palace Cinemas operates four cinemas, with two more under construction. They have two in Paddington, Sydney, one of which is the restored art-house Chauvel (Which mirrors the Astor in Melbourne programming) and the updated four screened Verona cinema. In the inner-west, Palace Cinemas also operates Norton Street cinema, which is its focus for its Italian film festival openings (due to the history of the Leichhardt). In 2017, Palace Cinemas opened its NSW flagship venue Palace Central, which has 10 normal screens and the first location of Palace Cinemas Palace Platinum, its first foray into premium content. Palace Cinemas is also constructing a cinema in Byron Bay and Double Bay, Sydney.

Palace does not own the cinemas in Perth outright, instead are owned and operated in partnership with Luna Cinemas. As such, the Perth cinemas are called "Luna Palace Cinemas" and have their own independent website, membership program and offers. Palace Cinema's regular nationwide membership and offers in other states, are therefore not necessarily valid at these cinemas. "Luna Palace" uniquely operates two seasonal outdoor cinemas, one in Leederville (opposite their traditional cinema) and one in Mosman Park.

Kino Cinemas in Melbourne is also a partnership operation.

Locations

Adelaide
 Palace Nova Eastend, 12 screens (Cinema Place), host of the Adelaide Film Festival from 2020 
 Palace Nova Prospect, 14 screens (Prospect Road)

Brisbane

 Barracks
 James Street (formerly Centro)

Byron Bay
 Byron Bay

Canberra
 Palace Electric

Melbourne

 The Astor Theatre (Classic films mostly)
 Balwyn
 Brighton Bay
 Dendy Brighton
 Pentrige Cinema (opened 2020, located in the new shopping centre in old Pentrige Prison, First Palace cinema with Dolby Atmos auditorium)
 Cinema Como
 The Kino (partnership)
 Westgarth

Perth
Cinemas wholly under the Palace banner:
 Raine Square

Cinemas in partnership with Luna Cinemas. The outdoor cinemas run during the summer months only.

 Luna Leederville 
 Luna on SX, Fremantle
 Windsor Cinema, Nedlands
 Luna Outdoor, Leederville
 Camelot Outdoor, Mosman Park

Sydney

 Central 
 Norton Street
 Verona
 The Chauvel Cinema

Closed cinemas

Adelaide
 Nova Eastend (Rundle Street)
 Prospect

Perth
 Palace Raine Square

Future cinemas

Sydney
 Double Bay (under construction)

Melbourne
 Moonee Ponds (under construction)

Film festivals
Palace Cinemas host regular minor international film festivals, including the Alliance Française French Film Festival, the Lavazza Italian Film Festival, the Spanish Film Festival, German Film Festival and the British Film Festival.

A major event, the 2020 Adelaide Film Festival, will be hosted by Palace Nova's Eastend and Prospect locations in South Australia.

Palace Films
Palace has produced and distributed such Australian films as Kokoda and Chopper, and distribute many foreign language films in Australia.

See also

List of companies of Australia
List of film production companies
List of television production companies

References

External links
Palace Cinemas website

Cinema chains in Australia
Film production companies of Australia
Australian companies established in 1930